This is a list of the Imams as recognized by the different sub-sects of the Ismai'li sect of Shia Islam. Imams are considered members of the Bayt (Household) of Muhammad through his daughter Fatimah.

Early Imams 
All Isma'ili sects  share the first four Imams with the Zaydi Shia, and the first six Imams with the Twelver Shia. The Nizari and Musta'li are collectively also known as Fatimid Isma'ili, in contrast to the Sevener Isma'ili.

After Ali ibn Husayn Zayn al-Abidin, the Zaydis consider Zayd ibn Ali to be their next Imam rather than his older brother Muhammad al-Baqir who is considered the next Imam by the Isma'ili and Twelvers. After Ja'far al-Sadiq, the Twelvers consider Musa ibn Ja'far to be their next Imam, whereas Fatimid Isma'ilis consider his older brother Isma'il ibn Ja'far to be their next Imam, followed next by his son Muhammad ibn Isma'il. The Sevener Isma'ilis consider either Isma'il ibn Jafar or his son Muhammad ibn Isma'il to be their final Imam and occulted Mahdi.

The Seveners propagated their faith from their bases in Syria through Da'iyyun. In 899, Abdallah al-Mahdi Billah announced that he was the "Imam of the Time" being also the fourth direct descendant of Muhammad ibn Isma'il in the very same dynasty, and proclaimed his previous three descendant Da'is to have been "hidden Imams". This caused a split between his Sevener followers accepting his claim and the Qarmatian who continued to dispute his claim and considered Muhammad ibn Isma'il as the Imam in occultation. Abdallah al-Mahdi Billah eventually became the first Fatimid Caliph with his empire spanning Egypt and the eastern Maghreb. Sevener communities continued to exist in Eastern Arabia and Syria, and for a while in northern Iran but where it was gradually replaced by Fatimid Isma'ilis and other Shiʿi communities.

Fatimid  
In the Fatimid and its successor Isma'ili traditions, the Imamate was held by the following. Each Imam listed is considered the son of the preceding Imam by mainstream accounts.

After his death, the succession was disputed. The regent Malik al-Afdal placed Mustansir's younger son Al-Musta'li Billah on the throne. This was contested by the elder son Nizar al-Mustafa li-Din Allah, who was defeated and died in prison. This dispute resulted in the split into two branches, lasting to this day, the Nizari and the Musta'li.

Musta'li 

The Musta'li recognized Imams:

Hafizi Ismaili Muslims claimed that al-Amir died without an heir and was succeeded as Caliph and Imam by his cousin al-Hafiz. The Musta'li split into the Hafizi, who accepted him and his successors as an Imam, and the Tayyibi, who believed that al-Amir's purported son At-Tayyib was the rightful Imam and had gone into occultation.

Tayyibi
The Tayyibi recognized Imam:

The Tayyibi branch continues to this day, headed by a Da'i al-Mutlaq as vice-regent in the imam's occultation.  The Tayibbi have broken into several branches over disputes as to which Da'i is the true vice-regent.  The largest branch are the Dawoodi Bohra, and there are also the Sulaymani Bohra and Alavi Bohra.

Hafizi
The Hafizi recognized Imams:

The Hafizi sect lived on until the 14th century in Egypt and Syria but had died out by the end of the 14th century.

Nizari 

Following the death of Shams al-Din Muhammad, the Nizari Isma'ili split into two groups: the Mu'mini Nizari (or, Muhammad-Shahi Nizari) who considered his elder son Ala al-Din Mu'min Shah to be the next Imam followed by his son Muhammad Shah, and the Qasimi Nizari (or, Qasim-Shahi Nizari) who consider his younger son Qasim Shah to be the next Imam

Mu'mini

Qasimi

Genealogy

See also 
 Mahdi

References 

 
 

Islam-related lists

Nizari imams
Musta'li imams
Isma'ilism-related lists
Lists of Islamic religious leaders